Buck Bumble is an action video game for the Nintendo 64 developed by British video game company Argonaut Software and released by Ubi Soft in 1998. A special Buck Bumble rumble pack was packaged with the U.K. version.

Plot
The year is 2010, and as the result of a previous spill at a chemical factory in London, England, the insects in the surrounding area have mutated. Several different types of these mutated insects gather together becoming the evil "Herd", who are bent on taking over the garden, and eventually the whole world. The game casts the player as a Buck Bumble, a volunteer bumblebee that gets implanted with cyborg technology. He is part of an organization known as "The Resistance", which is trying to stop the evil Herd Army. Buck's missions send him on multiple tasks, such as defending the resistance base, attacking Herd supply lines while traveling through sewers, and eventually fighting the Herd's mantis-like Queen.

Gameplay

The game features full-on 3D graphics, which was a novel feature for fifth generation consoles at the time. Buck can be armed with up to eleven different weapons, including such realistic weapons as a stun gun, a laser, a rocket launcher, and a guided missile launcher. While the levels are height-restricted, Buck can fly around in nineteen missions, some requiring the placement of a bomb without bumping it into anything. The player or players in two player mode can also perform various aerial acrobatics, similar to a fighter plane, in fact it was originally programmed as a flight game before it "evolved into a flying bee". The player controls the bee with moves such as loops and banking to the sides. At the top of the screen the player is given a radar screen which can be used to locate enemies within the level, a damage metre, and the player's current weapon. One level can have multiple locations which the player can reach by passing through teleporters, or gates. There are several items the player can collect while in each level, such as weapons, nectar from flowers to regain energy, and even point bonuses. Several of the game's enemies such as beetles and wasps have special generators that release another enemy when the first enemy is destroyed, requiring the player to destroy the generator itself to defeat the enemies and clear the stage. Besides the enemies, the player can also be drowned if in water for more than a couple of seconds.

Multiplayer

Buck Bumble has two multiplayer modes. The first, Buck Battle, allows up to two players to engage in an airborne dog-fight on a preset map. The second is a football-style game called Buzz Ball. The goal is to hit a giant soccer ball into the opposing player's net. As in Buck Battle, the player has the ability to kill the opponent in the process. Players are able to use two weapons from the game: a simple zapper, which gently moves the ball along, and a rocket launcher, which sends the ball flying in a different direction.

Development

The game was built with the rumble feature in mind, allowing the player to feel the impact of getting hit, supposedly increasing the sense of realism. This feature of the game was capitalized on by the company Joy Tech, which made an official "Buck Bumble Pack" which was sold with the game exclusively at Dixons and Currys, however it was a third-party peripheral not licensed by Nintendo. The game's soundtrack was composed by Justin Scharvona and consists entirely of speed garage. "I've intentionally tried to go for something that fits in with the futuristic, and not cutesy, something a bit harder", Scharvona explained. "We didn't want to do sort of boring techno stuff as well, or jungle, so we picked speed garage, it's funkier than house and garage".

Reception

While not heavily praised, and widely regarded as below contemporary N64 standards, Buck Bumble was met with generally positive reception from various gaming critics. Narayan Pattison of the Australian magazine N64 Gamer gave the game several compliments, comparing it to Star Fox for the Super Nintendo Entertainment System, which was also partly developed by Argonaut Games, saying that it avoids Star Foxs "restricted preset paths that had to be followed." They also compliment the game's designers for the added features, like the player being able to hover in the air, and drop down and walk across the ground, thus giving the player "the ability to try some new gameplay techniques that have never been used before." He describes the game's main theme as being a "very catchy dance beat that even has clear vocals." However, he was disappointed with the game's thick fog, repetitive textures, and that the save feature after each level, "makes the game too easy".

Next Generation reviewed the Nintendo 64 version of the game, rating it three stars out of five, and stated that "Overall, Buck Bumble is most like a diamond in the rough. There are a few edges that need to be polished, but as a whole, it still shines."

Matt Casamassina of IGN called it "the epitome of 'first generation' Nintendo 64 products" and compared it to a lower-quality version of the bee level in Banjo-Kazooie. This is largely due to its heavy distance fog, low frame-rate, and low-resolution graphics. Casamassina also considered the single-player levels too short and too easy. However, he praised the flying controls, the design of the title character, and the addictiveness of the Buzz Ball multiplayer mode.

Fabian Blache, III, of Dimension Publishing's Q64 magazine, compared the game's shooter style to the PlayStation game WarHawk. His first response to seeing the game was: "I was almost dreading having to labor through (what I perceived would be) inane gameplay at the hands of a childish premise." Praising the game's sound and graphics, he excused the fog because the game was "set in England". He finishes the review with "There aren't many games of this quality on the market today, and Argonaut should be proud to have this one as their own."

Another positive review came from Nintendojo. They stated that, while fog makes navigation difficult, "the graphics do not disappoint." In terms of multiplayer, the "extremely difficult" Buzz Battle was considered much less enjoyable than Buzz Ball. The review summarized stating, "Buck Bumble is definitely worth playing. While it isn't perfect, it's a fun game, and that's what really counts."

GameSpots Lauren Fielder gave the title a significantly lower review than most publishers and echoed the belief that it "missed the boat" of lower-quality first-generation N64 games. She criticized the flying and walking controls and deemed the multiplayer modes "seemingly quite literally thrown in." She closed by saying "In spite of all the obvious flaws, Buck Bumble is not a terrible game. It's just not a good game, and the rewards do not make up for the dull, tugging experience it quickly becomes."

References

1998 video games
Action video games
Argonaut Games games
Multiplayer and single-player video games
Nintendo 64 games
Nintendo 64-only games
Ubisoft games
Fictional bees
Video games about insects
Video games developed in the United Kingdom
Video games set in 2010